W. L. Weller is a brand of "wheated" bourbon whiskey. The brand was created by the Stitzel-Weller Distilling Company, and was sold several times after 1972. Since 1999, the brand has been owned by the Sazerac Company. It is produced at the Buffalo Trace Distillery in Frankfort, Kentucky. Like all bourbons, Weller is distilled from a mash composed of at least 51% corn (maize). The secondary grain used for the Weller brand is wheat, whereas most bourbons use rye.

Name
The bourbon was named after William Larue Weller (1825–1899), who was a distiller in the early days of Kentucky. He was supposedly the first to produce straight bourbon using wheat instead of rye in the mashbill. His wheated bourbon was first produced in 1849.

Brand expressions

Current
There are several bourbons produced under the W. L. Weller name:
Weller Special Reserve – "green label", bottled at 90 proof
Weller Antique 107 – "red label", bottled at 107 proof
Weller Single Barrel – "orange label", bottled at 97 proof
Weller Full Proof – "blue label", bottled at 114 proof, and non-chill filtered
Weller 12 Year – "black label", bottled at 90 proof
Weller C.Y.P.B. – "white label", bottled at 95 proof
William Larue Weller – Antique Collection, unfiltered and bottled at barrel proof

Past 
 W. L. Weller 19 year was bottled at 90 proof. It was released only for the 2000, 2001, and 2002 Antique Collections.
 W. L. Weller Centennial was aged for 10 years and bottled at 100 proof. It went out of production in 2009.

William Larue Weller bourbon 
Introduced in 2005 as part of the Buffalo Trace Antique Collection, William Larue Weller Kentucky Straight Bourbon Whiskey is an uncut, unfiltered bourbon that's bottled at barrel proof. The proof and age of this annual release varies from year to year:

Awards
The 2016 release of William Larue Weller, from the Buffalo Trace Antique Collection, was awarded a 2017 Double Gold medal by the San Francisco World Spirits Competition.

Old Weller Antique 107 was awarded a Gold Medal at the 2016 New York World Wine & Spirits Competition.

W. L. Weller 12 Year Old Bourbon won the designation of "Extraordinary / Ultimate Recommendation (95–100 pts)" from the 2015 Ultimate Spirits Challenge and a Silver Outstanding medal from the 2015 International Wine & Spirits Competition (UK).

Spirits writer Jim Murray named William Larue Weller Bourbon the "Second Finest Whisky in the World" in his Jim Murray's Whisky Bible 2015.  The 2015 release of William Larue Weller was awarded a Silver Outstanding medal from the 2016 International Wine & Spirits Competition (UK).

References

Bourbon whiskey
Sazerac Company brands